Michael Pangilinan is a Filipino singer-songwriter, actor, and model known for coming in second place in the second season of Your Face Sounds Familiar. He is also known for being a part of the band Harana.

Early life 
Michael Pangilinan is a native of Pulilan, Bulacan, he is the second of the three children of Tony and Precy Pangilinan who were car dealers whose passion for music has been part of their hobby.

Biography
Pangilinan first appeared on the franchise talent-search of ABS-CBN The X Factor Philippines in 2012, and was part of the Top 20 being eliminated during the "Judges House" episode. He then had many appearances on the late night show Walang Tulugan of GMA 7 In 2014, he got his first break in showbiz when he interpreted a Himig Handog PPop Love Songs entry by Joven Tan entitled "Pare, Mahal Mo Raw Ako" that immediately trended because it somewhat tackles the LGBT community with its theme. 

He was part of the impersonating competition called Your Face Sounds Familiar in its 2nd Filipino season where he finished first runner up to winner Denise Laurel. 

He also sang some of the theme songs of ABS-CBN's teleseries and Star Cinema movies. He was part of the singing group Harana together with Marlo Mortel, Bryan Santos and Joseph Marco. He has recorded albums under Star Music, namely self titled album Michael Panglinan and then Michael. Since 2018, he has been part of the all-male vocal trio BuDaKhel along with Bugoy Drilon and Daryl Ong.

Besides singing, Pangilinan can play the guitar without taking up formal lessons because his parents are into music. His R&B vocal style was influenced by musicians including Luke Mejares and Duncan Ramos. Among his musical influences were Janno Gibbs, Jay R and Brian McKnight.

Personal life
In 2015, it was announced that an ex-girlfriend Erin Ocampo was pregnant with his child and he pledged his support, saying that the two of them were still friends.

In 2016, it was confirmed that he is in a relationship with actress and singer Garie Concepcion, the daughter of actor Gabby Concepcion and Grace Ibuna.

Discography

Singles
 2014: "Pare, Mahal Mo Raw Ako" (Himig Handog P-Pop Love Songs 2014 (Song-writing contest))
 2015: "It Might Be You" (Everyday I Love You OST)
 2015: "Pusong Ligaw" (Bridges of Love OST)
2016: "Hanggang Kailan" (Michael Official Debut Album's Carrier Single)
2016: "Your Love (Tuo Amore)" (Dolce Amore OST)
2020 Hanggang kailan (I Have a lover  OST)

Albums
with Harana
 2014: Harana
Solo Albums
 2014: Michael Pangilinan (EP)
 2016: Michael

Filmography

Television

Film

Awards and nominations

References

1995 births
Living people
Baritones
Contemporary R&B singers
21st-century Filipino male singers
Filipino male television actors
Filipino male film actors
Musicians from Bulacan
People from Bulacan
Singers from Bulacan
GMA Network personalities
Participants in Philippine reality television series
ABS-CBN personalities
Star Music artists
Tagalog people